The Stang's First Cabinet governed Norway between 13 July 1889 and 6 March 1891. It was led by Emil Stang and is one of two Conservative Party-only cabinets ever in Norway, the other being Willoch's First Cabinet from 1981 to 1983. It had the following composition:

Cabinet members

|}

State Secretary
Not to be confused with the modern title State Secretary. The old title State Secretary, used between 1814 and 1925, is now known as Secretary to the Government (Regjeringsråd).

Halfdan Lehmann

References
Emil Stang's First Government. 13 July 1889 - 6 March 1891 - Government.no

Notes

Stang 1
Stang 1
1889 establishments in Norway
1891 disestablishments in Norway
Cabinets established in 1889
Cabinets disestablished in 1891